is a music video game, and a part of the Dance Dance Revolution series. The arcade version of DDR X3 was revealed by Konami on June 2, 2011. The sequel to Dance Dance Revolution X2, X3 began public beta testing on June 8, 2011. Promotional information for the game revealed the full name for the game, called  due to the new "2ndMix" mode in the game. It was released in Japan on November 16, 2011 for dedicated cabinets and November 30, 2011 for upgrade kits, and December 16, 2011 in Asia.

Development

Development on X3 began shortly after X2 was released. From June 8 to June 10, 2011, a location test was held in Akihabara, Tokyo. This location test revealed new songs and other features. These features included the new Target Score and BEMANI folders. The menu screens also got an update; they are now blue instead of green. Other enhancements to the theme were also made, such as the animation of the background, which was very similar to the one used on Dance Dance Revolution II). Konami also announced that there would be a new 2ndMIX mode, where the player could play a full HD version of DDR 2ndMIX.

Features
2ndMIX mode. The player is able to play a HD remaster of "DanceDanceRevolution 2ndMIX", including all licenses except "STRICTLY BUSINESS" from the game. E-Amusement capabilities are added to the mode.
Quick Play mode, a similar mode to "Marathon Mode" from DDR X2 in which PASELI users can use the pay-per-song method for as much stages as the arcade allows. For some time, this mode was also the only way to access the Challenge charts of some songs.
Target Score, which allows players to view machine and e-Amusement records without playing the song.
"BEMANI Title" sort, which allows songs to be sorted by the BEMANI title they originally appeared in.
DRILL COURSE has been removed.
Last Dance Dance Revolution game with Course mode until Dance Dance Revolution A20.
There are some arcade machines of DDR X3 in which judgment of streaked notes and the quantity of combos are placed under the note strip while others are placed on top of the note strip.
Selecting a song folder will either:
Show song selections under it and hide the other folders, or
Show the other folders and hide the song selection under it.

DDR X3 also supports "e-AMUSEMENT GATE", a community website where players can form groups, share scores, and interact with other players.

Enjoy Level
As in previous games, DDR X3 vs 2ndMix uses a level unlocking system to unlock some of the game's unlockable content. Players need to fulfill certain requirements to fill up the "Enjoy Level" bar and when it is full, the player will level up and potentially unlock a song. This requires e-Amusement. Most of Enjoy Level unlocks are songs taken from North American DDR 2010 and DDR II, in addition to new songs.

Extra Stage
DDR X3 also implements a new system for accessing Extra Stage. "Star system" can now be used to access Extra Stage. When the player clear a song, they will get stars (shown below the grade) depending on what grade they get:
AAA grade = 3 stars
AA grade = 2 stars
A-D grade = 1 star
Song or course failed (E) = 0 stars
Getting a full combo = Additional 1 star (Except AAA and E)
There are also two other ways to obtain stars. An additional star will be awarded if e-Amusement players clear a song on a specific difficulty depending on their dance title, with higher ranking necessitating a higher level (e.g. those with "足はじめ" title can get a star by clearing a 7-footer or higher, while those with "足鳳凰" only get a star if they clear a 16-footer or higher). From February 2, 2012 onward, e-Amusement players also receive a star after their first play of the day.

A slot with 9 star slots will be displayed below the results screen. When the player earn 9 stars, they can access Extra Stage regardless of their grade. After using them though, they will reset and the player must earn them back. For players with e-Amusement, if they do not have enough stars to access Extra Stage at the end of a credit, the stars will be carried over to their next playthrough. This does not apply to players without e-Amusement, who must score 3 stars each song if they want to access Extra Stage (as a result, they have to score either AAA or AA with full combo on all songs).

The new song available for Extra Stage is Amalgamation. In addition, the Encore Extra Stage songs are eventually accessible as Extra Stages after a specified date, with UNBELIEVABLE (Sparky remix) being available on January 25, 2012, NEPHILIM DELTA on April 25, 2012. As of July 23, 2012, all Extra Stage songs have been unlocked for regular play.

Encore Extra Stage
The requirement for accessing Encore Extra Stage is the same from DDR X2; score AA or better under Expert on the specific song during Extra Stage. Scoring AA or better on Amalgamationon Expert will grant the players access to UNBELIEVABLE (Sparky remix) on Expert. Two additional songs were added for Encore Extra Stage after a specified date: NEPHILIM DELTA can be accessed from January 25, 2012 onward by scoring AA or better on UNBELIEVABLE (Sparky remix) on Expert, and SILVER☆DREAM can be accessed from April 25, 2012 onward by scoring AA or better on NEPHILIM DELTA on Expert. All Encore Extra Stage songs have been unlocked as of July 23, 2012.

Extra Tour
A new Extra Stage event, called "EXTRA Tour" was announced on May 12, 2012 and started on May 14, 2012. In this event, new songs were added as Extra Stage. They appeared in specific regions at first and moved to other regions each day. The first song, tokyoEVOLVED appeared in Hokkaido and Okinawa Prefectures and moved to the south (for Hokkaido) and north (for Okinawa) until they eventually landed on each other's region. There was also a second route, starting on May 16, 2012 from Mie Prefecture and Fukui Prefecture. The new song available in these routes was osaka EVOLVED -毎度、おおきに！-.

The third route was announced May 19, 2012 and started on May 22, 2012 from Hokkaido and Okinawa Prefectures. The new song available in this route was New York EVOLVED. The fourth and final route was announced on May 26, 2012 and started on May 30, 2012 from Hokkaido and Okinawa Prefectures yet again. The new song available in this route was London EVOLVED.

After playing all Extra Tour songs at least once, scoring AA or better on Expert on any of these songs would unlock the Encore Extra Stage, Tohoku EVOLVED. The Extra Tour event was ended on July 22, 2012 and all songs were unlocked for regular play.

Crossover DDR
On August 2, 2012, a new event called "Crossover DDR" was started. In this event, players could unlock the 2ndMix-exclusive songs for use in X3 mode. Players simply needed to play the charts of the songs in 2ndMix mode to unlock them in X3 mode. As 2ndMix Mode only feature Basic, Difficult, and Expert charts for Single (or only Basic and Difficult in Double), the Beginner chart would be automatically unlocked once the player unlocked at least one of the main difficulties, while the Double Expert as well as Single and Double Challenge charts (which all songs have) would be unlocked once the player unlocked all other charts.

Three boss songs also could also be unlocked through this event. Clearing all charts in Normal mode of the 2ndMix mode would unlock "TRIP MACHINE EVOLUTION" on Extra Stage, while clearing all charts in Hard mode would unlock "PARANOiA Revolution". Scoring AA or better on these songs on Expert would unlock the Encore Extra Stage, LOVE IS THE POWER Re:born. The 1-life battery in Encore Extra Stage was uniquely made to fail the player if they get GREAT or lower (instead of GOOD or lower).

The event was ended on November 5, 2012 and all songs were unlocked for regular play.

Internet Ranking
The game had Internet Ranking like previous games. As usual, it used the courses available in the game. The game used e-Amusement to upload the scores to network. There were five Internet Rankings :
INTERNET RANKING#1 = February 8, 2012 - February 22, 2012 ~ uses HYPER and vs X3
INTERNET RANKING#2 = February 29, 2012 - March 14, 2012 ~ uses VOCAL and UPPER
INTERNET RANKING#3 = March 28, 2012 - April 15, 2012 ~ uses TAG PLATINUM and vs 2ndMIX
INTERNET RANKING#4 = May 9, 2012 - May 27, 2012 ~ uses RECOMMEND and BEMANI
INTERNET RANKING#5 = July 4, 2012 - July 22, 2012 ~ uses EVOLVED and Revolution

Daily Special
On AOU 2012, Konami announced a new event called "Daily Special" that started February 20, 2012. In this event, a new BEMANI crossover was available on each day of the week (from Monday to Friday). The cycle of the song unlocking was done on 12.00 P.M. (JP UTC) and required e-Amusement. The songs were:
SigSig
message
天上の星 ～黎明記～ (Tenjou no Hoshi ~Reimeiki~)
繚乱ヒットチャート (Ryouran Hit Chart)
雫 (Shizuku)
The cycle of the song unlocking were shuffled three times, on March 19, April 16, and May 14, 2012. An additional event, called "Weekend Special" was started on May 5, 2012. It occurred only during weekends (Saturday and Sunday) and also cycled the songs, only instead of days, they cycled based on hours. Both events were ended on May 28, 2012 and all songs were unlocked for regular play.

Append travel
DDR X3 was one of the BEMANI games that held the new APPEND TRAVEL event to promote jubeat copious APPEND. The event was started on March 14, 2012. Players could collect APPEND ENERGY and buy items from e-Amusement GATE, some of which altered aspects of the game. Those were:
Accessory - Jubeat Mask
Item - Enjoy Full Stage (would be able to pass the stage even if the dance meter is empty)
Item - Enjoy Level Booster (leveling up Enjoy Level became easier)
The event ended on September 24, 2012.

Music
The game's song list is split into two modes, X3 and 2ndMix. 2ndMix mode exclusively contains the song list of Dance Dance Revolution 2ndMix, while X3 contains the rest of new and returning songs.

X3 mode
There are 75 new songs. In addition, all songs which were previously exclusive to 2ndMix mode are accessible in this mode as of August 2, 2012. A total of 21 songs from previous games were removed, all of them being licenses; 1 out of 3 from Dance Dance Revolution SuperNova 2, 16 out of 25 from Dance Dance Revolution X, and 4 out of 21 from Dance Dance Revolution X2. Dancemania licenses that were brought back in Dance Dance Revolution X and Dance Dance Revolution X2 remain, while all licensed songs from A Different Drum records have been removed. The licensed tracks brought over from Dance Dance Revolution X2 (PS2) and Dance Dance Revolution Hottest Party 3 have also been removed.

Counting the revivals, there are a total of 516 songs in X3 mode. With the exception of the removed songs listed, all songs from Dance Dance Revolution X2 are still playable.

2ndMIX mode
The 2ndMix mode exclusively contains DDR 2ndMix's song list as well as two new songs. Note that the song "Strictly Business" as well as the songs that were introduced in the LINK version are not included in this mode. There are a total of 30 songs. As of August 2, 2012, all songs from this mode can be unlocked in X3 mode (except for "HERO", which uses the X-edit version from DDR X2 instead of the original version).

Courses
In Course Mode, players go through five or six songs back-to-back, with no breaks. Players may set options before a course is played, but not midway between songs. Two difficulties are offered: Normal and Difficult. The dance gauge used is different between courses; courses with five songs use the normal dance gauge, while those with six songs use the battery dance gauge, where scoring a "Good", "Miss", or "N.G." judgment step will drain a non-renewable bar. In Normal difficulty, players start with eight bars, while Difficult only gives them four bars. X3 vs. 2ndMix was the last Dance Dance Revolution game to feature courses until Dance Dance Revolution A20.

Soundtrack
The Original Soundtrack for the "X3 Side" of DDR X3 vs 2ndMix was officially announced on April 20, 2012. It spans two discs, the first containing DDR X3 new songs and some songs from console versions while the second containing the rest of the songs from console versions, BEMANI crossovers, and disc specials. It was released on June 27, 2012.

Several promotions were held to commemorate the release of the soundtrack. This includes a Twitter campaign, release party, and autographs signing of the game producers.

References

External links
DanceDanceRevolution X3 location test site 
Official website 

2011 video games
Arcade video games
Arcade-only video games
Dance Dance Revolution games
Video games developed in Japan
Multiplayer and single-player video games